2,3,4-Pentanetrione (or IUPAC name pentane-2,3,4-trione, triketopentane or dimethyl triketone) is the simplest linear triketone, a ketone with three C=O groups.  It is an organic molecule with formula CH3COCOCOCH3.

Production
2,3,4-Pentanetrione can be made by oxidizing 2,4-pentanedione with selenium dioxide.
Ludwig Wolff made the 2,3 oxime by reacting hydroxylamine with isonitrosoacetylacetone in cold, aqueous, concentrated solution.

Yet other ways to make triones start from a β-dione, and oxidise the carbon at the α position, between the two ketone groups. Different methods include reaction with bromine to make a dibromide, and then reacting with acetaldehyde and hydrolysing. Nitrogen oxides can also be used. Another way is by reacting 2,4-pentandedione with p-nitroso-N,N-dimethylaniline; forming an α-diazo-β-dicarbonyl derivative compound, and then reacting that with triphenylphosphine, and then hydrolyzing with sodium nitrite solution. Or the α-diazo-β-dicarbonyl derivative can be treated with tert-butylhypochlorite.

Properties
2,3,4-Pentanetrione appears as an orangy-red oil. The more intense colour is due to the greater conjugation of double bonds, and potential resonance. The type of colour centre is called a dependent chromophore, as when there are fewer C=O groups the colour is less intense or absent.  So diacetyl with two carbonyls groups is yellow, and acetone with one has no colour.

At a reduced pressure of 20 mmHg it boils at 60 °C. It is hygroscopic.

The odour is strong and not bad.

Reactions
On absorbing water, perhaps from the atmosphere, 2,3,4-pentanetrione forms a hydrate. The hydrate melts at 52 °C. The hydrate with formula CH3COC(OH)2COCH3 is colourless.

2,3,4-Pentanetrione is a strong reducing agent. Thermal decomposition catalyzed by copper sulfate results in carbon dioxide and diacetyl.

2,3,4-Pentanetrione reacts with hydrogen peroxide to yield acetic acid and carbon monoxide. Adding HOOH between C2 and C4 yields a cyclic intermediate which decomposes.

With light or organic peroxides, a free radical reaction can take place (as with triketones), whereby the molecule is slit into CH3COCO• and CH3CO• fragments.  These can combine with intact molecules or each other to form other ketones.

When heating 2,3,4-pentanetrione with oxygen, the oxidation products are diacetyl, acetic acid, water and carbon dioxide.

Alkalis convert it into acetic acid and formaldehyde.

2,3,4-Pentanetrione does a condensation reaction with o-phenylenediamine to yield methyl-quinoxaline-2-methylketone, a heterocyclic dicycle. In this the carbon number 2 and 3 react with the amine groups, leaving the CO on number 5 alone.

Another condensation can happen with 2,5,6-triamino-4(3H)pyrimidinone giving 6-acetyl-2-amino-7-methyl-4(3H)pteridinone.

Grignard agents react. Phenyl magnesium bromide in excess reacting with 2,3,4-pentanetrione gives phenylacetylcarbinol and also methyldiphenylcarbinol.

Derivatives
Derivatives include 2,3,4-pentanetrione-3-oxime, 2,3,4-pentanetrione-3-(O-methyloxime), 2,3,4-pentanetrione-2-oxime, 2,3,4-pentanetrione-2,3-dioxime, 2,3,4-pentanetrionetrioxime, 2,3,4-pentanetrione semicarbazone, 2,3,4-pentanetrione phenylhydrazone, 2,3,4-pentanetrione bis(phenylhydrazone).

The 3-oxime melts at 75 °C and the bis(semicarbazone) has a melting point of 221 °C.

References

Triketones
Conjugated ketones